Melashvili is a Georgian surname. Notable people with the surname include:
George Melashvili (born 1994), Georgian public figure, scholar of political sciences
Tamta Melashvili (born 1979), Georgian writer and a feminist activist

Surnames of Georgian origin
Georgian-language surnames
Surnames of Abkhazian origin